Julie Manet (14 November 1878 – 14 July 1966) was a French painter, model, diarist, and art collector.

Biography
Born in Paris, Manet was the daughter and only child of artist Berthe Morisot and Eugène Manet, younger brother of painter Édouard Manet. The death of both parents within a three-year period left her orphaned at the age of 16. As a result, she came under the guardianship of the poet and critic Stéphane Mallarmé and went to live with her cousins. She also received support from the family's artist friends, Renoir in particular.

Throughout her life Julie posed frequently for her mother and other Impressionist artists, including Renoir and her uncle Édouard.

Book
Her teenage diary, published in English as Growing up with the Impressionists, provides insights into the lives of French painters, including Renoir, Degas, Monet, and Sisley, as well the 1896 state visit of Tsar Nicholas II and the Dreyfus Affair, which was then raging in France. Notably, her candid accounts of dinner-table conversations about that Affair cast light on Renoir's privately held views on patriotism and anti-Semitism.

Personal life
Her mother, Berthe Morisot, died of pneumonia when she was only 16, in 1895.

In May 1900 Julie married the painter and engraver Ernest Rouart, artist and son of the painter Henri Rouart. The wedding, which took place in Passy, was a double ceremony in which Julie's cousin Jeannine Gobillard married Paul Valéry. Julie had three children, Julien (born 1901), Clément (born 1906) and Denis (born 1908). Both Julien and Denis inherited some of Morisot's paintings, now in the Marmottan Monet Museum.

Julie Manet as model

References

Further reading

Denvir, Bernard, The Chronicle of Impressionism: An Intimate Diary of the Lives and World of the Great Artists. London: Thames & Hudson, 2000.
McCouat, Philip, Julie Manet, Renoir and the Dreyfus Affair, in Art in Society http://www.artinsociety.com
Meyers, Jeffrey, Impressionist Quartet: The Intimate Genius of Manet and Morisot, Degas and Cassatt. Orlando: Harcourt, 2005.
Thomson, Belinda, Impressionism: Origins, Practice, Reception. The world of art library. London: Thames & Hudson, 2000.

External links

French women painters
Artists from Paris
French art collectors
Women art collectors
French artists' models
French diarists
19th-century French painters
20th-century French painters
1878 births
1966 deaths
Burials at Passy Cemetery
Women diarists
20th-century French women artists
19th-century French women artists
Édouard Manet